James Adams may refer to:

Academia
James Adams (Jesuit) (1737–1802), English philologist
James Truslow Adams (1878–1949), American historian
James Luther Adams (1901–1994), American theologian
James B. Adams (professor), professor at Arizona State University
James Noel Adams (1943–2021), emeritus Fellow of All Souls College, Oxford and historian of the Latin language

Arts and entertainment
James Barton Adams (1843–1918), cowboy poet
James Adams (entrepreneur), American author and entrepreneur
James B. Adams (composer), English composer, organist, and cellist
Jim Adams (musician) (born 1967), American heavy metal guitarist
James Adams (character), character in the CHERUB series by Robert Muchamore

Government and politics
James Adams (MP) (1752–1816), British Member of Parliament and Lord of the Admiralty
James Adams (Massachusetts politician) (1810–1880), mayor of Charlestown, Massachusetts
James Hopkins Adams (1812–1861), American governor of South Carolina
J. M. Adams (1834–1875), American politician in Wisconsin
James L. Adams (1921–2014), American politician
James B. Adams (1926–2020), former attorney, Texas legislator, and acting director of the Federal Bureau of Investigation
James Adams (diplomat) (1932–2020), British diplomat
W. James Adams, deputy chief technologist at NASA

Religion
James Adams (Archdeacon of Kildare) (1780–1864), Irish Anglican priest
James Adams (Latter Day Saints) (1783–1843), American lawyer and intimate friend of the Joseph Smith, Jr., founder of the Latter Day Saint movement
James Adams (chaplain) (1839–1903), Irish recipient of the Victoria Cross
James Adams (bishop of Barking) (1915–1999), fifth Bishop of Barking, 1975–1983
James M. Adams Jr. (born 1948), Episcopal bishop in America

Sports
James Adams (cricketer, born 1811) (1811–1851), English cricketer
James Adams (cricketer, born 1904) (1904–1988), Australian cricketer
James Adams (cricketer, born 1980) (born 1980), English cricketer
James Adams (footballer, born 1864) (1864–1943), Scottish footballer
James Adams (footballer, born 1896) (1896–1973), English footballer who played for Chesterfield
James Adams (footballer, born 1908) (1908–1983), English footballer who played for West Bromwich Albion
Jim Adams (baseball) (1868–?), American baseball player
Jim Adams (lacrosse) (1928–2019), American college lacrosse coach
Jim Adams (soccer) (born 1969), English soccer player

Other
James "Grizzly" Adams (1812–1860), American hunter, basis of a television program
James F. Adams (1844–1922), American Civil War Medal of Honor recipient
James W. Adams, carpenter, builder and designer in Kentucky

See also
James (name), given first name
Adams (surname), given second name
James Adams Floating Theatre
James Adam (disambiguation)
Jimmy Adams (disambiguation)
Jamie Adams (born 1987), Scottish footballer